The 1980 CONCACAF Under-20 Championship was held in the United States. It also served as qualification for the 1981 FIFA World Youth Championship.

Haiti were initially set to host the tournament but later withdrew.

Teams
The following teams entered the tournament:

Group stage

Group Los Angeles

Group Dallas
In this group, Puerto Rico were disqualified for using non eligible players.

Group Edwardsville

Group Princeton

Quarterfinals

Semifinals

Final

Qualification to World Youth Championship
The two best performing teams qualified for the 1981 FIFA World Youth Championship.

External links
Results by RSSSF

CONCACAF Under-20 Championship
1980 in youth association football